Slupiec may refer to:
Słupiec, Lesser Poland Voivodeship, a village in southern Poland
Słupiec, Świętokrzyskie Voivodeship, a village in south-central Poland
Słupiec, a former village in south-western Poland, now part of Nowa Ruda

See also
Słupca
Słupsk